Radu Rebeja (born 8 June 1973) is a Moldovan former football player who played as defensive midfielder or centre-back. He has been a leader and captain of the Moldova national football team for 74 matches and was formerly the captain of FC Moscow.

Awards 
In 2006, he was awarded the Moldovan Footballer of the Year award. Rebeja is also one of the most capped Moldova national football team players.

Rebeja was one of the 11 Moldovan football players to be challenged to a game of tennis by Tony Hawks and is featured in his 2012 book Playing the Moldovans at Tennis.

Post-football achievements 
In 2008, he ended his career as a professional football player and became the Vice President of the Moldovan Football Federation.

In 2015, he took up the post of Adviser for Youth and Sports to the Prime Minister of Moldova, Chiril Gaburici.

In 2018, he was selected as the Secretary of State in the Ministry of Education, Culture and Research.

In 2019, he became an independent deputy in the Parliament of Moldova.

In August 2019, he opened a professional football academy called  (The Radu Rebeja Football Academy).

International goals
Scores and results list Moldova's goal tally first.

References

External links 
 
 
 
 Website of Rebeja's football academy

1973 births
Living people
Moldovan footballers
Moldova international footballers
Association football midfielders
FC Zimbru Chișinău players
Moldovan Super Liga players
FC Saturn Ramenskoye players
FC Moscow players
FC Elista players
Russian Premier League players
Moldovan expatriate footballers
Expatriate footballers in Russia
FC Khimki players